The Portuguese local elections of 2013 took place on 29 September. The elections consisted of three types of elections in the 308 Portuguese municipalities, namely the elections for the Municipal Chambers, whose winners are elected mayors, the elections for the Municipal Assemblies, as well as the elections for the lower-level Parish Assemblies, whose winners are elected parish presidents. The latter were held separately in the more than 3,000 parishes around the country. The number of parishes had been reduced by over 1000 due to a local government reform undertaken by the Government led by Pedro Passos Coelho.

The process of submitting candidacies for these elections was marked by differences in the interpretation of the pertinent electoral law. This law prohibits a candidate, after having served for three terms, to run for Mayor, Municipal Assemblies or Parish Assemblies. But the law does not explicitly state whether it prohibits reelection only for the same municipality or parish, or for the same position in any municipality or parish. Candidates affected by this issue included Luís Filipe Menezes (PSD), running in Porto, and Fernando Seara (PSD/CDS–PP), who was standing in Lisbon.

This controversy ended on 5 September 2013 with the decision of the Constitutional Court allowing mayoral candidates that had already served three consecutive mandates to run for election in a different municipality.

The Socialist Party (PS) won the largest number of municipal chambers in its history surpassing its previous best result in 2009. It also won the largest number of mayorships of any party in the history of Portugal. The PS also reconquered Coimbra and won in two large strongholds of the Social Democratic Party, Vila Real and Funchal.

The Social Democratic Party (PSD) was the biggest loser of these elections, as it lost almost a third of the municipalities that it had held. However, the PSD did gain several traditionally Socialist bastions like Braga and Guarda. The communist Democratic Unity Coalition won in the cities of Loures, Beja and Évora.

The election was also marked by the strong electoral performances of various independent groups, which won several chambers. The most significant was the victory of independent Rui Moreira in Porto, who was supported by CDS-PP. The Democratic Unity Coalition increased its number of municipal chambers as well as its number of councilors by winning several chambers previously held by the Socialists, including winning back their historical stronghold of Loures. However, despite increasing their overall number of mayors, they also lost three chambers they won in 2009 to the Socialists; Chamusca, Crato, and Nisa. In Chamusca they had held the mayorship since 1979.

The People's Party (CDS-PP) broke a cycle of decline in local elections and won five municipalities, four more than in 2009. The Left Bloc suffered a heavy defeat, losing the only chamber they had, and electing fewer councillors than in 2009.

The turnout in these elections was the lowest ever, with 52.6% of voters casting their ballot.

Parties 

The main political forces that will be involved in the election are:

 Left Bloc (BE)
 People's Party (CDS–PP)  (only in some municipalities)1
 Democratic Unity Coalition (CDU)
 Socialist Party (PS)
 Social Democratic Party (PSD) (only in some municipalities)1

1 The PSD and the CDS–PP will also form coalitions in several municipalities with the Earth Party (MPT) and the People's Monarchist Party (PPM).

Opinion polling

Results

Municipal Councils

National summary of votes and seats

|-
! rowspan="2" colspan=2 style="background-color:#E9E9E9" align=left|Parties
! rowspan="2" style="background-color:#E9E9E9" align=right|Votes
! rowspan="2" style="background-color:#E9E9E9" align=right|%
! rowspan="2" style="background-color:#E9E9E9" align=right|±pp swing
! rowspan="2" style="background-color:#E9E9E9" align=right|Candidacies
! colspan="2" style="background-color:#E9E9E9" align="center"|Councillors
! colspan="2" style="background-color:#E9E9E9" align="center"|Mayors
|- style="background-color:#E9E9E9"
! style="background-color:#E9E9E9" align="center"|Total
! style="background-color:#E9E9E9" align="center"|±
! style="background-color:#E9E9E9" align="center"|Total
! style="background-color:#E9E9E9" align="center"|±
|-
| 
|1,812,029||36.26||1.4||303||923||2||149||17
|-
| 
|834,455||16.70||6.3||201||531||135||86||31
|-
| 
|552,690||11.06||1.3||288||213||39||34||6
|-
|style="width: 10px" bgcolor=#FF9900 align="center" | 
|align=left|Social Democratic / People's
|379,110||7.59||2.1||73||154||3||16||3
|-
|style="width: 8px" bgcolor=gray align="center" |
|align=left|Independents
|344,531||6.89||2.8||94||112||45||13||6
|-
| 
|152,073||3.04||0.1||143||47||16||5||4
|-
| 
|120,982||2.42||0.6||109||8||1||0||1
|-
|style="width: 9px" bgcolor=#FF9900 align="center" | 
|align=left|PSD / CDS–PP / MPT
|100,437||2.01||2.0||6||11||2||0||0
|- 
|style="width: 9px" bgcolor=#FF9900 align="center" | 
|align=left|PSD / CDS–PP / PPM
|94,015||1.88||0.1||4||21||6||2||1
|- 
|style="width: 9px" bgcolor=#FF9900 align="center" | 
|align=left|PSD / PPM
|65,102||1.30||—||7||21||—||1||—
|-
|style="width: 9px" bgcolor=#FF9900 align="center" | 
|align=left|PSD / PPM / MPT
|43,312||0.87||—||7||7||—||0||—
|-
|style="width: 9px" bgcolor=#FF9900 align="center" | 
|align=left|PSD/ CDS–PP / MPT / PPM
|23,551||0.47||2.5||4||14||7||1||0
|-
| 
|23,276||0.47||0.3||27||0||0||0||0
|-
|style="width: 9px" bgcolor=#FF66FF align="center" |
|align=left|PS / BE / PND / MPT / PTP / PAN
|21,102||0.42||—||1||5||—||1||—
|-
|style="width: 9px" bgcolor=#FF9900 align="center" | 
|align=left|PSD / MPT / PPM
|19,804||0.40||—||4||4||—||0||—
|-
| 
|16,233||0.32||—||8||0||—||0||—
|-
|style="width: 8px" bgcolor=#0093DD align="center" |
|align=left|CDS–PP / MPT / PPM
|9,299||0.19||—||7||1||—||0||—
|-
|style="width: 9px" bgcolor=#FF9900 align="center" | 
|align=left|PSD/ CDS–PP / PPM / MPT 
|8,918||0.18||1.1||4||4||5||0||1
|- 
|style="width: 10px" bgcolor=#CC0033 align="center" | 
|align=left|Labour
|8,552||0.17||—||22||0||—||0||—
|-
| 
|6,660||0.13||0.1||8||2||0||0||0
|-
|style="width: 8px" bgcolor=#0093DD align="center" |
|align=left|People's / Social Democratic
|4,656||0.09||—||4||4||—||0||—
|-
|style="width: 8px" bgcolor=#005FAD align="center" |
|align=left|PPM / PND / PPV
|3,634||0.07||—||1||0||—||0||—
|-
| 
|3,002||0.06||0.1||6||0||0||0||0
|-
|style="width: 8px" bgcolor=#0093DD align="center" |
|align=left|People's / Earth 
|2,931||0.06||0.1||3||0||0||0||0
|-
|style="width: 9px" bgcolor=#FF66FF align="center" |
|align=left|PS / PTP / PND / BE 
|2,157||0.04||—||1||1||—||0||—
|-
|style="width: 9px" bgcolor=#FF9900 align="center" | 
|align=left|Social Democratic / Earth
|1,897||0.04||—||2||3||—||0||—
|-
| 
|1,272||0.03||0.1||1||0||1||0||0
|-
|style="width: 8px" bgcolor=#005FAD align="center" |
|align=left|People's Monarchist / PPV
|856||0.02||—||1||0||—||0||—
|-
| 
|455||0.01||0.0||1||0||0||0||0
|-
|style="width: 10px" bgcolor=#000080 align="center" | 
|align=left|Portugal Pro-Life
|338||0.01||—||1||0||—||0||—
|-
|colspan=2 align=left style="background-color:#E9E9E9"|Total valid
|width="65" align="right" style="background-color:#E9E9E9"|4,657,329
|width="40" align="right" style="background-color:#E9E9E9"|93.18
|width="40" align="right" style="background-color:#E9E9E9"|3.8
|width="40" align="right" style="background-color:#E9E9E9"|—
|width="45" align="right" style="background-color:#E9E9E9"|2,086
|width="45" align="right" style="background-color:#E9E9E9"|8
|width="45" align="right" style="background-color:#E9E9E9"|308
|width="45" align="right" style="background-color:#E9E9E9"|0
|-
|colspan=2|Blank ballots
|193,471||3.87||2.2||colspan=5 rowspan=4|
|-
|colspan=2|Invalid ballots
|147,205||2.95||1.7
|-
|colspan=2 align=left style="background-color:#E9E9E9"|Total
|width="65" align="right" style="background-color:#E9E9E9"|4,998,005
|width="40" align="right" style="background-color:#E9E9E9"|100.00
|width="40" align="right" style="background-color:#E9E9E9"|
|-
|colspan=2|Registered voters/turnout
||9,501,103||52.60||6.4
|-
| colspan=11 align=left | Source: Autárquicas 2013 Resultados Oficiais
|}

Municipality map

City control
The following table lists party control in all district capitals, as well as in municipalities above 100,000 inhabitants. Population estimates from 2013.

Municipal Assemblies

National summary of votes and seats

|-
! rowspan="2" colspan=2 style="background-color:#E9E9E9" align=left|Parties
! rowspan="2" style="background-color:#E9E9E9" align=right|Votes
! rowspan="2" style="background-color:#E9E9E9" align=right|%
! rowspan="2" style="background-color:#E9E9E9" align=right|±pp swing
! rowspan="2" style="background-color:#E9E9E9" align=right|Candidacies
! colspan="2" style="background-color:#E9E9E9" align="center"|Mandates
|- style="background-color:#E9E9E9"
! style="background-color:#E9E9E9" align="center"|Total
! style="background-color:#E9E9E9" align="center"|±
|- 
| 
|1,746,819||34.95||1.7||||2,659||196
|-
| 
|813,835||16.28||5.9||||1,588||536
|-
| 
|599,029||11.98||1.4||||747||96
|-
|style="width: 10px" bgcolor=#FF9900 align="center" | 
|align=left|Social Democratic / People's
|376,056||7.52||1.8||||493||29
|-
|style="width: 8px" bgcolor=gray align="center" |
|align=left|Independents
|325,724||6.52||2.8||||352||128
|-
| 
|159,921||3.20||0.3||||224||29
|-
| 
|157,686||3.15||1.0||||100||39
|-
|style="width: 9px" bgcolor=#FF9900 align="center" | 
|align=left|PSD / CDS–PP / MPT
|106,725||2.14||2.1||||42||36
|- 
|style="width: 9px" bgcolor=#FF9900 align="center" | 
|align=left|PSD / CDS–PP / PPM
|88,393||1.77||0.0||||72||12
|- 
|style="width: 9px" bgcolor=#FF9900 align="center" | 
|align=left|PSD / PPM
|60,873||1.22||—||||57||—
|-
|style="width: 9px" bgcolor=#FF9900 align="center" | 
|align=left|PSD / PPM / MPT
|41,307||0.83||—||||18||—
|-
| 
|23,776||0.48||—||||5||—
|-
|style="width: 9px" bgcolor=#FF9900 align="center" | 
|align=left|PSD/ CDS–PP / MPT / PPM
|22,420||0.45||2.5||||37||28
|-
|style="width: 9px" bgcolor=#FF66FF align="center" |
|align=left|PS / BE / PND / MPT / PTP / PAN
|20,849||0.42||—||||14||—
|-
|style="width: 9px" bgcolor=#FF9900 align="center" | 
|align=left|PSD / MPT / PPM
|19,850||0.40||—||||11||—
|-
| 
|15,393||0.31||0.2||||2||2
|-
|style="width: 8px" bgcolor=#0093DD align="center" |
|align=left|CDS–PP / MPT / PPM
|9,949||0.20||—||||9||—
|-
|style="width: 9px" bgcolor=#FF9900 align="center" | 
|align=left|PSD/ CDS–PP / PPM / MPT 
|8,886||0.18||1.0||||10||12
|- 
| 
|5,525||0.11||0.1||||11||3
|-
|style="width: 8px" bgcolor=#0093DD align="center" |
|align=left|People's / Social Democratic
|4,647||0.09||—||||17||—
|-
|style="width: 8px" bgcolor=#005FAD align="center" |
|align=left|PPM / PND / PPV
|4,451||0.09||—||||0||—
|-
|style="width: 10px" bgcolor=#CC0033 align="center" | 
|align=left|Labour
|4,102||0.08||—||||3||—
|-
|style="width: 8px" bgcolor=#0093DD align="center" |
|align=left|People's / Earth
|3,384||0.07||0.1||||3||3
|-
| 
|3,247||0.06||0.1||||0||0
|-
|style="width: 9px" bgcolor=#FF66FF align="center" |
|align=left|PS / PTP / PND / BE 
|2,101||0.04||—||||3||—
|-
|style="width: 9px" bgcolor=#FF9900 align="center" | 
|align=left|Social Democratic / Earth
|2,008||0.04||—||||8||—
|-
| 
|1,505||0.03||0.1||||0||5
|-
|style="width: 8px" bgcolor=#005FAD align="center" |
|align=left|People's Monarchist / PPV
|1,046||0.02||—||||0||—
|-
| 
|445||0.01||0.0||||2||3
|-
|colspan=2 align=left style="background-color:#E9E9E9"|Total valid
|width="65" align="right" style="background-color:#E9E9E9"|4,629,952
|width="40" align="right" style="background-color:#E9E9E9"|92.63
|width="40" align="right" style="background-color:#E9E9E9"|4.1
|width="40" align="right" style="background-color:#E9E9E9"|—
|width="45" align="right" style="background-color:#E9E9E9"|6,487
|width="45" align="right" style="background-color:#E9E9E9"|459
|-
|colspan=2|Blank ballots
|215,489||4.31||2.3||colspan=6 rowspan=4|
|-
|colspan=2|Invalid ballots
|153,068||3.06||1.8
|-
|colspan=2 align=left style="background-color:#E9E9E9"|Total
|width="65" align="right" style="background-color:#E9E9E9"|4,998,509
|width="40" align="right" style="background-color:#E9E9E9"|100.00
|width="40" align="right" style="background-color:#E9E9E9"|
|-
|colspan=2|Registered voters/turnout
||9,501,103||52.61||6.4
|-
| colspan=11 align=left | Source: Autárquicas 2013 Resultados Oficiais
|}

Parish Assemblies

National summary of votes and seats

|-
! rowspan="2" colspan=2 style="background-color:#E9E9E9" align=left|Parties
! rowspan="2" style="background-color:#E9E9E9" align=right|Votes
! rowspan="2" style="background-color:#E9E9E9" align=right|%
! rowspan="2" style="background-color:#E9E9E9" align=right|±pp swing
! rowspan="2" style="background-color:#E9E9E9" align=right|Candidacies
! colspan="2" style="background-color:#E9E9E9" align="center"|Mandates
! colspan="2" style="background-color:#E9E9E9" align="center"|Presidents
|- style="background-color:#E9E9E9"
! style="background-color:#E9E9E9" align="center"|Total
! style="background-color:#E9E9E9" align="center"|±
! style="background-color:#E9E9E9" align="center"|Total
! style="background-color:#E9E9E9" align="center"|±
|-
| 
|1,733,687||34.69||1.6||||10,838||2,898||1,282||295
|-
| 
|815,086||16.31||6.1||||6,927||4,186||912||618
|-
| 
|596,324||11.93||1.0||||1,973||293||170||43
|-
|style="width: 8px" bgcolor=gray align="center" |
|align=left|Independents
|478,273||9.57||3.5||||2,978||305||342||10
|-
|style="width: 10px" bgcolor=#FF9900 align="center" | 
|align=left|Social Democratic / People's
|363,145||7.27||1.9||||2,096||815||222||90
|-
| 
|139,304||2.79||0.5||||725||33||50||3
|-
| 
|115,191||2.30||0.7||||138||97||0||4
|-
|style="width: 9px" bgcolor=#FF9900 align="center" | 
|align=left|PSD / CDS–PP / MPT
|111,571||2.23||2.2||||322||293||18||16
|- 
|style="width: 9px" bgcolor=#FF9900 align="center" | 
|align=left|PSD / CDS–PP / PPM
|81,096||1.62||0.2||||453||48||44||8
|- 
|style="width: 9px" bgcolor=#FF9900 align="center" | 
|align=left|PSD / PPM
|55,186||1.10||—||||251||—||21||—
|-
|style="width: 9px" bgcolor=#FF9900 align="center" | 
|align=left|PSD / PPM / MPT
|44,661||0.89||—||||91||—||6||—
|-
|style="width: 9px" bgcolor=#FF9900 align="center" | 
|align=left|PSD / MPT / PPM
|19,908||0.40||—||||39||—||2||—
|-
|style="width: 9px" bgcolor=#FF9900 align="center" | 
|align=left|PSD/ CDS–PP / MPT / PPM
|19,397||0.39||2.5||||88||296||3||28
|-
|style="width: 9px" bgcolor=#FF66FF align="center" |
|align=left|PS / BE / PND / MPT / PTP / PAN
|18,967||0.38||—||||53||—||5||—
|-
|style="width: 8px" bgcolor=#0093DD align="center" |
|align=left|CDS–PP / MPT / PPM
|8,966||0.18||—||||12||—||0||—
|-
|style="width: 9px" bgcolor=#FF9900 align="center" | 
|align=left|PSD/ CDS–PP / PPM / MPT 
|8,344||0.17||0.9||||44||124||2||13
|- 
| 
|8,003||0.16||0.1||||2||2||0||0
|-
|style="width: 8px" bgcolor=#005FAD align="center" |
|align=left|PPM / PND / PPV
|4,729||0.09||—||||0||—||0||—
|-
| 
|4,569||0.09||0.1||||18||29||0||2
|-
|style="width: 8px" bgcolor=#0093DD align="center" |
|align=left|People's / Social Democratic
|4,303||0.09||—||||63||—||5||—
|-
| 
|4,001||0.08||—||||1||—||0||—
|-
|style="width: 10px" bgcolor=#CC0033 align="center" | 
|align=left|Labour
|2,681||0.05||—||||1||—||0||—
|-
| 
|2,670||0.05||0.1||||5||2||0||0
|-
|style="width: 9px" bgcolor=#FF9900 align="center" | 
|align=left|Social Democratic / Earth
|2,123||0.04||—||||27||—||1||—
|-
|style="width: 9px" bgcolor=#FF66FF align="center" |
|align=left|PS / PTP / PND / BE 
|2,085||0.04||—||||7||—||0||—
|-
|style="width: 8px" bgcolor=#0093DD align="center" |
|align=left|People's / Earth
|1,610||0.03||0.0||||4||1||0||0
|-
| 
|716||0.01||0.0||||0||0||0||0
|-
| 
|549||0.01||0.0||||11||8||0||0
|-
|style="width: 10px" bgcolor=red align="center" | 
|align=left|Communist
|57||0.00||—||||0||—||0||—
|-
|style="width: 8px" bgcolor=#005FAD align="center" |
|align=left|People's Monarchist / PPV
|47||0.00||—||||0||—||0||—
|-
|colspan=2 align=left style="background-color:#E9E9E9"|Total valid
|width="65" align="right" style="background-color:#E9E9E9"|4,647,249
|width="40" align="right" style="background-color:#E9E9E9"|92.99
|width="40" align="right" style="background-color:#E9E9E9"|3.4
|width="40" align="right" style="background-color:#E9E9E9"|—
|width="45" align="right" style="background-color:#E9E9E9"|27,167
|width="45" align="right" style="background-color:#E9E9E9"|7,505
|width="45" align="right" style="background-color:#E9E9E9"|3,085
|width="45" align="right" style="background-color:#E9E9E9"|1,022
|-
|colspan=2|Blank ballots
|194,978||3.90||1.8||colspan=5 rowspan=4|
|-
|colspan=2|Invalid ballots
|155,271||3.11||1.6
|-
|colspan=2 align=left style="background-color:#E9E9E9"|Total
|width="65" align="right" style="background-color:#E9E9E9"|4,997,498
|width="40" align="right" style="background-color:#E9E9E9"|100.00
|width="40" align="right" style="background-color:#E9E9E9"|
|-
|colspan=2|Registered voters/turnout
||9,500,202||52.60||6.4
|-
| colspan=11 align=left | Source: Autárquicas 2013 Resultados Oficiais
|}

See also
 Politics of Portugal
 List of political parties in Portugal
 Elections in Portugal

References

External links 
 Official site Autárquicas 2013
 Official results site, Portuguese Justice Ministry
 Portuguese Electoral Commission
 ERC - Official publication of polls

2013
2013 elections in Portugal
September 2013 events in Europe